Superheroes Decoded is a series of superhero documentaries that aired on History Channel.

Analysts include Stan Lee and George R.R. Martin. Anthony Mackie, the actor who plays Falcon in the Marvel Cinematic Universe, also gives input.

The series is narrated by Kevin Conroy, the actor who has voiced Bruce Wayne / Batman in numerous Batman media starting with Batman: The Animated Series.

Episodes
American Legends, 20 May 2017, focuses on Superman, Batman, Captain America and Spider-Man
American Rebels, 27 May 2017, focuses on Black Panther, Wonder Woman, Luke Cage and Wolverine

References

External links

2017 American television series debuts
2017 American television series endings
2010s American documentary television series
History (American TV channel) original programming
American superhero television series